Ovidiu Cojocaru (born 19 November 1996) is a Romanian rugby union player. He plays as a hooker for professional SuperLiga club CSM Baia Mare.

Club career
Ovidiu Cojocaru started playing rugby in 2010 as a youth for CFR, a local Romanian club based in Pașcani. After one year he moved to the seaside joining  CS Cleopatra Mamaia. In July 2015 he started his professional journey joining SuperLiga side, CSM Baia Mare.

International career
Cojocaru is also selected for Romania's national team, the Oaks, making his international debut in a test match against the Tupis on 24 June 2017.

References

External links
 
 
 

1996 births
Living people
People from Pașcani
Romanian rugby union players
Romania international rugby union players
CSM Știința Baia Mare players
Rugby union hookers